Boris Lvovich Vasilyev (21 May 1924 – 11 March 2013) was a Soviet and Russian writer and screenwriter. He is considered the last representative of the so-called lieutenant prose, a group of former low-ranking Soviet officers who dramatized their traumatic World War II experience.

Biography
Born into a family of Russian nobility. His father Lev Aleksandrovich Vasilyev (1892—1968) came from a dynasty of military officers; he served in the Imperial Russian Army and took part in the First World War in the rank of Poruchik before joining the Red Army. Vasilyev's mother Yelena Nikolayevna Alekseyeva (1892—1978) belonged to a noble Alekseyev family tree that traces its history back to the 15th century; her father was among the founders of the Circle of Tchaikovsky.

In 1941, Boris Vasilyev volunteered for the front line and joined a destruction battalion. He fought as part of the 3rd Guards Airborne Division up until 1943 when he was wounded in action and demobilized. After his World War II service, Vasilyev enrolled at the Malinovsky Tank Academy.

His short novel The Dawns Here Are Quiet was a Soviet bestseller, selling 1.8 million copies within a year after its publication in 1969. It was adapted for the stage and the screen; there is also an opera by Kirill Molchanov, and a Chinese TV series based on the story.

The Dawns Here Are Quiet was the first of Vasilyev's sentimental patriotic tales of female heroism in the Second World War ("Not on the Active List", 1974; "Tomorrow Was the War", 1984) which brought him renown in the Soviet Union, China, and other communist countries. Some of his books give a harsh picture of life in Stalin's Russia.

Vasilyev's short novel Do Not Shoot at White Swans (1973), a milestone of Russian-language environmental fiction, is sharply critical of "the senseless destruction of beautiful creatures and the exploitation of nature for personal gain". It was made into a 1980 Soviet film.

Vasilyev was awarded the USSR State Prize for 1975 and was a member of the jury at the 39th Berlin International Film Festival. In 1989, he quit the Communist Party but grew disillusioned with the Perestroika rather quickly. In October 1993, he signed the Letter of Forty-Two. Late in life, Vasilyev turned to historical fiction based on incidents from medieval Russian chronicles.

Vasilyev died on 11 March 2013 following the deaths of his wife and his adopted son earlier the same year. He was buried at the Vagankovo Cemetery near his wife.

Selected filmography

References

External links
 

1924 births
2013 deaths
20th-century Russian male writers
Academicians of the Russian Academy of Cinema Arts and Sciences "Nika"
Communist Party of the Soviet Union members
Recipients of the Lenin Komsomol Prize
Recipients of the Nika Award
Recipients of the Order "For Merit to the Fatherland", 2nd class
Recipients of the Order "For Merit to the Fatherland", 3rd class
Recipients of the Order of Friendship of Peoples
Recipients of the Order of the Red Banner of Labour
Recipients of the USSR State Prize
Russian historical novelists
Russian male writers
Russian memoirists
20th-century Russian screenwriters
Male screenwriters
Soviet Army officers
Soviet male writers
Soviet military personnel of World War II
Soviet screenwriters
Burials at Vagankovo Cemetery